This is an incomplete list of Bien de Interés Cultural landmarks in the Province of Santa Cruz de Tenerife, Spain.

 Basilica of Candelaria
 Casa Anchieta
 Castillo de Santa Catalina (La Palma)
 Castle of San Andrés
 Castle of St John the Baptist
 Cave of Chinguaro
 Caves of Don Gaspar
 Guía de Isora
 Icod de los Vinos
 Iglesia de la Concepción (San Cristóbal de La Laguna)
 Iglesia de la Concepción (Santa Cruz de Tenerife)
 Iglesia de San Francisco de Asís (Santa Cruz de Tenerife)
 Iglesia de Santo Domingo de Guzmán (San Cristóbal de La Laguna)
 La Laguna Cathedral
 Lago Martiánez
 Los Silos
 Masonic Temple of Santa Cruz de Tenerife
 Museo Municipal de Bellas Artes de Santa Cruz de Tenerife
 Museo de la Naturaleza y Arqueología
 Shrine of Our Lady of Mount Carmel (Los Realejos)
 Teatro Guimerá

References 

Bien de Interés Cultural landmarks in the Province of Santa Cruz de Tenerife
Santa Cruz de Tenerife